Ipatovo is a town and the administrative center of Ipatovsky District in Stavropol Krai, Russia, located on the Kalaus River about  northeast of Stavropol, the administrative center of the krai. Population: 

It was previously known as Chemrek, Vinodelnoye (until 1935).

History
It was founded in 1860 as the settlement of Chemrek. It was later renamed Vinodelnoye (lit. winemaking) because there had been many state wine cellars. In 1935, the settlement was renamed Ipatovo in honor of Civil War hero P. M. Ipatov, who died here in 1918. Ipatovo was granted town status in 1979.

Administrative and municipal status
Within the framework of administrative divisions, Ipatovo serves as the administrative center of Ipatovsky District. As an administrative division, it is, together with three rural localities, incorporated within Ipatovsky District as the Town of Ipatovo. As a municipal division, the Town of Ipatovo is incorporated within Ipatovsky Municipal District as Ipatovo Urban Settlement.

References

Notes

Sources

External links

Official website of Ipatovo 
Ipatovo Business Directory 

Cities and towns in Stavropol Krai
Populated places established in 1860